Lurgi can refer to:
 Lurgi AG : The German Chemical and construction company
 the Lurgi process for making gas from carbonaceous fuel under high pressure
 Lurgi generator - a device used to produce gas from coal (see Gasification)
 the dreaded lurgi (a fictional disease)